Aeroméxico and Aeroméxico Connect, which are both commercialized as Aeroméxico, serve the following destinations, .

Aeroméxico destinations

Aeroméxico Connect destinations
Aeroméxico Connect serves the following destinations (as of March 2023):

References

Lists of airline destinations
Aeroméxico
SkyTeam destinations